Labokro is a village in central Ivory Coast. It is in the sub-prefecture of Attiégouakro in the Attiégouakro Department of the Autonomous District of Yamoussoukro.

Labokro was a commune until March 2012, when it became one of 1126 communes nationwide that were abolished.

Notes

Former communes of Ivory Coast
Populated places in Yamoussoukro